Suita Dam  is a gravity dam located in Kochi Prefecture in Japan. The dam is used for power production. The catchment area of the dam is 440 km2. The dam impounds about 94  ha of land when full and can store 10532 thousand cubic meters of water. The construction of the dam was started on 1952 and completed in 1959.

See also
List of dams in Japan

References

Dams in Kōchi Prefecture